Nabil Ali Muhammad (Abu Rashid) Shaath (also spelled Sha'ath; born August 1938 in Safad) is a senior Palestinian official.

Career

In politics 

He has held the following titles: 
Palestinian chief negotiator
Palestinian International Co-operation Minister
Planning Minister for the Palestinian National Authority
Acting Prime Minister of the PNA
Shaath served as the Palestinian Authority's first ever foreign minister from April 2003 to February 2005.

Shaath was a Deputy Prime Minister and Minister of Information in the Palestinian Authority Government of February 2005. On 15 December 2005, he became Acting Prime Minister of the Palestinian Authority after Ahmad Qurei resigned. He lost that position nine days later when Qurei returned to office.

Bush anecdote 
Shaath made news on 7 October 2005 by commenting for a BBC documentary that in a 2003 meeting with United States President George W. Bush, Bush told him and other Palestinian officials that Bush was "driven with a mission from God."

According to Shaath, the quotation was this:

"God would tell me, George, go and fight those terrorists in Afghanistan. And I did, and then God would tell me, George, go and end the tyranny in Iraq... And I did.

"And now, again, I feel God's words coming to me, Go get the Palestinians their state and get the Israelis their security, and get peace in the Middle East. And by God I'm gonna do it."

Shaath later qualified his comments, saying that he and other world leaders at a Jordan summit two years ago "understood that he was illustrating [in his comments] his strong faith and his belief that this is what God wanted." Both the White House and Palestinian leader Mahmoud Abbas, who was also present at the meeting, denies that Bush ever made such a statement.

University of Pennsylvania
Shaath received his masters degree in Finance from the Wharton School of the University of Pennsylvania and his P.h.D. in Economics from the University of Pennsylvania School of Arts and Sciences. Shaath taught at the University from 1961 to 1965.

Film appearances
Shaath appeared in the 2009 documentary Back Door Channels: The Price of Peace which deals with the peace treaty between Israel and Egypt. The film is being released by Channel Productions in New York City.

References

External links

 Bush God comments 'not literal' – BBC News
 http://www.backdoorchannels.com/

1938 births
Living people
Fatah members
Palestinian refugees
People from Safed
Members of the 2006 Palestinian Legislative Council
Foreign ministers of the Palestinian National Authority
Government ministers of the Palestinian National Authority
Prime Ministers of the Palestinian National Authority
Central Committee of Fatah members
Members of the 1996 Palestinian Legislative Council